Mátyás Lelkes (born 15 May 1984) is a Slovak football player of Hungarian ethnicity player who currently plays for TJ OFC Gabčíkovo.

References
Profile at MLSZ 

1971 births
Living people
Hungarians in Slovakia
Slovak footballers
Association football defenders
FC DAC 1904 Dunajská Streda players
MŠK Novohrad Lučenec players
Slovak expatriate footballers
Expatriate footballers in Hungary
Kaposvári Rákóczi FC players
Slovak expatriate sportspeople in Hungary